There are six Geopolitical zones in Nigeria and about 250 ethnic groups with over 521 languages. However, the Constitution of Nigeria as amended in 1999 permits freedom of assembly, associations and civil societies irrespective of the geopolitical zones, ethnic groups and languages.
Civil societies plays a key role in the nation's development and growth.

Below is a list of notable civil societies in Nigeria:

Oodua Peoples Congress
Arewa People's Congress
Ohanaeze Ndigbo
PANDEF - Pan Niger Delta Forum
Movement for the Emancipation of the Niger Delta
Nigeria Labour Congress
Red Cross Society
Boys Scout
Girls scout
ASUU - Academic Staff Union of University
AWACIO - Aids for Women, Adolescents and Children International Organization

See also
 Law of Nigeria

References

Lists of organizations based in Nigeria